Robert E. Rose (October 7, 1939 – February 14, 2022) was an American politician. A member of the Democratic Party, he was the 26th lieutenant governor of Nevada from 1975 to 1979 and was the party's nominee for Governor of Nevada in 1978. In 1986, Rose was appointed to the Eighth Judicial District Court. He was elected three times to the Nevada Supreme Court serving from 1989 to 2007.

Early life and education 
Rose was born in Orange, New Jersey, on October 7, 1939, and raised in Livingston, New Jersey. He graduated from Livingston High School in 1957, Juniata College in 1963 and New York University School of Law in 1964. He was president of the first graduating class at Livingston High School and was inducted into the school's hall of fame in 1994.

Death 
Rose died in Reno, Nevada, on February 14, 2022, at the age of 82.

References

External links 
 Profile from JAMS Foundation

1939 births
2022 deaths
20th-century American politicians
District attorneys in Nevada
Juniata College alumni
Lieutenant Governors of Nevada
Livingston High School (New Jersey) alumni
New York University School of Law alumni
Justices of the Nevada Supreme Court
Candidates in the 1978 United States elections
People from Livingston, New Jersey
People from Orange, New Jersey
Nevada Democrats
Chief Justices of the Nevada Supreme Court